A list of the published work by or about American poet Robert Pinsky.

Poetry
Collections
 
 
 
 
The Figured Wheel: New and Collected Poems 1966–1996 (1996) Farrar, Straus and Giroux
Jersey Rain (2000) Farrar, Straus and Giroux
Gulf Music: Poems (2007) Farrar, Straus and Giroux
Selected Poems (2011) Farrar, Straus and Giroux
At the Foundling Hospital (2016) Farrar, Straus and Giroux

Poems

Prose
Landor's Poetry (1968) University of Chicago Press
The Situation of Poetry (1977) Princeton University Press
Poetry and the World (1988) Ecco Press
The Sounds of Poetry (1998) Farrar, Straus and Giroux
Democracy, Culture, and the Voice of Poetry (2002) Princeton University Press
The Life of David (2006) Schocken Books
Thousands of Broadways: Dreams and Nightmares of the American Small Town (2009) University of Chicago Press

Librettos
 Death and the Powers, an opera by Tod Machover (2010)
 Canto V (2007) a choral work with 3 or 4 voices and either piano or orchestra.  Five excerpts from Inferno of Dante.  Collaborated with composer Ezra Laderman

Interactive fiction
Mindwheel (1984)

As translator
The Separate Notebooks by Czeslaw Milosz, with Renata Gorczynski and Robert Hass (1984)
The Inferno of Dante: A New Verse Translation (1995)

As editor
Handbook of Heartbreak (1998)
Americans' Favorite Poems: The Favorite Poem Project Anthology, with Maggie Dietz (1999)
Poems to Read: A New Favorite Poem Project Anthology (2002)
An Invitation to Poetry: A New Favorite Poem Project Anthology (2004)
Essential Pleasures: A New Anthology of Poems to Read Aloud (2009)
Singing School: Learning to Write (and Read) Poetry by Studying with the Masters (2014)

CDs
PoemJazz (2012) Circumstantial Productions

Notes

Bibliographies by writer
Bibliographies of American writers